Oliver James Scarles (born 12 December 2005) is an English professional footballer who plays as a midfielder for West Ham United.

Club career
From Kent, Scarles attended the Trinity School in Croydon. Scarles was with West Ham at under-8 level and rejoined after briefly playing with Chelsea until under-12s. In June 2022 Scarles signed a scholarship contract with West Ham.

Scarles was named in the starting eleven for his senior debut for West Ham United on 3 November 2022 in the UEFA Europa Conference League against FCSB. West Ham won the game 3–0 with West Ham manager, David Moyes describing Scarles debut game as "exceptional".

International career
Scarles has played for the England national under-17 football team, making his debut in September 2021.

Career statistics

References

2005 births
Living people
English footballers
Association football midfielders
West Ham United F.C. players
England youth international footballers
People from Bromley